Mil Qader-e Olya (also Romanized as Mīl Qāder-e ‘Olyā) is a village in Jeygaran Rural District, Ozgoleh District, Salas-e Babajani County, Kermanshah Province, Iran. At the 2006 census, its population was 138, in 33 families.

References 

Populated places in Salas-e Babajani County